Andrew Matthews-Owen is a Welsh pianist and accompanist. He was born at Neath, Wales, and now lives in London, England.

He enjoys a busy career partnering some of the UK's leading singers, on the concert platform, on record and as a performance and vocal coach. Concert engagements have taken him to major venues around the UK and abroad, most notably the Wigmore Hall, Southbank Centre (Queen Elizabeth Hall and Purcell Room), Kings Place, Warehouse, Birmingham Symphony Hall, St David's Hall, National Portrait Gallery and on the Cutting Edge Tour, with artists including Patricia Bardon, Susan Bickley, Claire Booth, Susan Bullock, Anne-Sophie Duprels, Rebecca Evans, Helen Field, John MacMaster Gail Pearson, Natalya Romaniw, Nicky Spence, Elin Manahan Thomas, Katie Van Kooten, Sir Willard White, French horn player Richard Watkins percussionist Joby Burgess and the Brodowski and Allegri string quartets.

He has also appeared in words and music revues, with actors and personalities including Alexander Armstrong, Katie Derham and in numerous performances of A Celebration of Jane Austen with actors Robert Powell, Elizabeth Garvie and flautist Clive Conway.

Matthews-Owen has broadcast live on numerous occasions for BBC Television and BBC Radio 3, most recently from the Purcell Room, Southbank Centre. He is fast developing a reputation in contemporary music, regularly giving premieres of scores by eminent composers including Michael Berkeley, Charlotte Bray, Philip Cashian, Laurence Crane, Jonathan Dove, Alun Hoddinott, Simon Holt, Hannah Kendall, Joseph Phibbs, Arlene Sierra and Augusta Read Thomas.

Releases of CDs for major labels Naxos and NMC have garnered considerable critical acclaim. Recent discs of song cycles by Jonathan Dove (Naxos), Alun Hoddinott (Naxos) and Charlotte Bray (NMC) have been 'Editor's Choice', 'Disc of the Year' and 'Recommended Recording of the Month' in Gramophone magazine, and included in The Times 'Best CDs of 2014'.

Matthews-Owen's debut solo CD for Nimbus of premiere recordings of piano music by composers Joseph Phibbs, Hannah Kendall and the Grammy-nominated Dobrinka Tabakova was released to critical acclaim in 2017, and appeared in the UK Specialist Classical Charts.

Recent CDs include an award winning recording of Debussy, Fauré and Satie songs, with a new cycle by Jonathan Dove setting Debussy's Letters to Lily Texier and Emma Bardac ('Letters from Claude') which was one of the AllMusic.com Discs of the Year 2019. In 2020 Andrew also featured on a new portrait CD of the American composer Augusta Read Thomas.

He studied at Cardiff University as an undergraduate, before winning a scholarship place as a postgraduate at the Royal Academy of Music generously supported by the RAM Trust, S4C Wales Television, Sir Edward Heath, Coutt's Bank and the Rayne Foundation. He has also studied privately with Christine Croshaw, Roger Vignoles, Michael Pollock and Eugene Asti.

Matthews-Owen is currently Lead Tutor and Head of Piano (JT) and teaches piano and performance classes at the Trinity Laban Conservatoire of Music and Dance. He has also given master classes and workshops at the Royal College of Music, and the universities of Cardiff and Hull.

Competition successes include the Sir Henry Richardson Award for Accompanists (MBF), John Ireland Trust Prize, Elisabeth Schumann Lieder Prize and the Ryan Davies Memorial Award.

In 2011, Matthews-Owen was awarded the inaugural T.Glanville Jones/Leo Abse and Cohen Award by the Welsh Music Guild for ‘Outstanding Contribution to Welsh Music.’

He was elected an Associate of the Royal Academy of Music in May 2012.

References

External links
 Official website

Welsh classical pianists
Male classical pianists
Alumni of Cardiff University
Alumni of the Royal Academy of Music
People from Neath
Living people
Accompanists
Year of birth missing (living people)
21st-century classical pianists
21st-century British male musicians